Respectable Women (German: Anständige Frauen) is a 1920 German silent drama film directed by Carl Wilhelm and starring Ressel Orla, Heinrich Schroth and Olga Limburg.

The film's sets were designed by the art director Fritz Kraencke.

Cast
 Erra Bognar
 Olga Limburg
 Paul Morgan
 Ressel Orla
 Heinrich Schroth
 Rosa Valetti

References

Bibliography
 Grange, William. Cultural Chronicle of the Weimar Republic. Scarecrow Press, 2008.

External links

1920 films
Films of the Weimar Republic
Films directed by Carl Wilhelm
German silent feature films
1920 drama films
German drama films
German black-and-white films
Silent drama films
1920s German films